The Princess Mary Maternity Hospital was a health facility in Jesmond, Newcastle upon Tyne. It is a Grade II listed building.

History

The hospital has its origins in the Lying-in Hospital established in Rosemary Lane in Newcastle upon Tyne in 1760. Lying-in is an archaic term for childbirth (referring to the month-long bed rest prescribed for postpartum confinement). The Lying-in Hospital moved to a purpose-built facility in New Bridge Street designed by John Dobson in 1826.

After the Lying-in Hospital in New Bridge Street was deemed inadequate, a new facility was built in Jubilee Road and officially opened by Princess Mary as the Princess Mary Maternity Hospital in 1923. During the Second World War the hospital moved to the old home of the Northern Counties Orphans' Institution in Jesmond. After maternity services transferred to the Royal Victoria Infirmary, the Princess Mary Maternity Hospital closed in 1993 and the building was converted into apartments as Princess Mary Court in 2000.

Notes

References 

Hospital buildings completed in 1873
Hospitals in Tyne and Wear
Buildings and structures in Newcastle upon Tyne
1760 establishments in England
Defunct hospitals in England
Maternity hospitals in the United Kingdom